Robotic Empire is an American independent record label based out of Richmond, Virginia, specializing in hardcore punk, heavy metal, and alternative rock. Some of the most popular bands signed to the label over the years have been pg.99, City of Caterpillar, Crowpath, The Red Chord, Circle Takes the Square, Cursive, Versoma, Daughters, Isis, Kayo Dot, Cave In, Red Sparowes, Torche and Hot Cross. Robotic Empire was known as Robodog Records for their first 14 releases.

In the 2010s, the label released a series of Nirvana tribute albums annually for Record Store Day: In Utero, in Tribute, in Entirety (2014), Whatever Nevermind (2015) and Doused in Mud, Soaked in Bleach (2016). They all featured prominent figures in the post-hardcore scene with all three including covers by Circa Survive, Thou and Young Widows, and also included prominent performances by These Arms Are Snakes, Jay Reatard, Daughters, Torche and The Fall of Troy.

The label also operates The Archivist, a digital-download label that reissues rare and out-of-print albums released between the late 1990s and the early 2000s.

Roster 

The Abandoned Hearts Club
A Days Refrain
Agoraphobic Nosebleed
Alien Crucifixion
A Life Once Lost
Battle of Mice
Benumb
Capsule
Cave In
The Catalyst
Circle of Dead Children
Circle Takes the Square
Creation Is Crucifixion
Crestfallen
Crowpath
Cursive
Daughters
Daybreak
Dikfore
Ed Gein 
Enkephalin
Employer Employee
Excitebike
Floor
Garuda
The Ghastly City Sleep
Gnob
Gods And Queens
Grails
Gregor Samsa
Hassan I Sabbah
Hot Cross
Hollow Sunshine
House of Low Culture
Isis
Jesu
Joshua Fit For Battle
Kayo Dot
Kungfu Rick
Majority Rule
Magrudergrind
Malady
Mannequin
Matamoros
The Minor Times
Municipal Waste
Neil Perry
Nemo
The Now
Opeth
pg.99
Pig Destroyer
Pilgrim Fetus
Pink Razors
Pygmy Lush
Reactor No. 7
The Red Chord
Red Sparowes
Riddle of Steel
The Sacrifice Poles
Sea of Thousand
Shitstorm
Stop It!!
Superstitions of the Sky
Torche
Transistor Transistor
Tyranny of Shaw
The Ultimate Warriors
Ultra Dolphins
Vadim Taver (This Day Forward, Marigold)
Verse En Coma
Versoma
Wadge
Windmills By The Ocean
Young Widows

The Archivist

 The Assistant
 City of Caterpillar
 Cloacal Kiss
 Employer, Employee
 Forcefedglass
 Forstella Ford
 Grief
 Harkonen
 Hassan I Sabbah
 Idolands
 Joshua Fit for Battle
 Lick Golden Sky
 Love Lost But Not Forgotten
 Majority Rule
 The Now
 Pushmen
 Ratking
 Reactor No.7
 Riddle of Steel
 Transistor Transistor
 The Ultimate Warriors
 Welcome the Plague Year
 Wraith

See also
 List of record labels

References

External links 
 Official site

American independent record labels
Hardcore record labels
Heavy metal record labels
Grindcore record labels
Alternative rock record labels